2478 Tokai, provisionally designated , is a stony Florian asteroid and binary system from the inner regions of the asteroid belt, approximately 10 kilometers in diameter. It was discovered on 4 May 1981, by Japanese astronomer Toshimasa Furuta at Tōkai Observatory, Japan. The asteroid was named after the city of Tōkai.

Orbit and classification 

Tokai is a member of the Flora family, one of the largest groups of stony asteroids in the main-belt. It orbits the Sun in the inner main-belt at a distance of 2.1–2.4 AU once every 3 years and 4 months (1,213 days). Its orbit has an eccentricity of 0.07 and an inclination of 4° with respect to the ecliptic.

Physical characteristics 

In the SMASS classification, Tokai is a common S-type asteroid.

Diameter and albedo 

According to the surveys carried out by the Japanese Akari satellite, and NASA's Wide-field Infrared Survey Explorer (WISE) with its subsequent NEOWISE mission, Tokai measures between 9.238 and 9.982 kilometers in diameter and its surface has an albedo between 0.144 and 0.33. The Collaborative Asteroid Lightcurve Link agrees with Petr Pravec's revised WISE-data, that is, an albedo of 0.1957 and a diameter of 10.09 kilometers with an absolute magnitude of 12.37.

Satellite 

Photometric observations in 2007, revealed a minor-planet moon in orbit of Tokai. It measures approximately 6 kilometers in diameter (lower limit diameter ratio of 0.72) and has an orbital period of 25.88 hours.

Naming 

This minor planet was named after the city of Tōkai, Japan, where the discoverer lives and the discovering observatory is located. The approved naming citation was published by the Minor Planet Center on 8 February 1982.

Notes

References

External links 
 Lightcurve plot of 2478 Tokai, Palmer Divide Observatory, B. D. Warner (2007)
 Asteroids with Satellites, Robert Johnston, johnstonsarchive.net
 Asteroid Lightcurve Database (LCDB), query form (info )
 Dictionary of Minor Planet Names, Google books
 Asteroids and comets rotation curves, CdR – Observatoire de Genève, Raoul Behrend
 Discovery Circumstances: Numbered Minor Planets (1)-(5000) – Minor Planet Center
 
 

002478
Discoveries by Toshimasa Furuta
Named minor planets
002478
002478
19810504